Fatoot samneh is a dish originating in Yemeni cuisine, consisting of pieces of saluf or malawach (Yemeni flatbreads), or pita, that have been fried in clarified butter and combined with beaten egg. It is commonly served as a breakfast or dinner dish. It was brought to Israel by Yemenite Jews. It is somewhat similar to the Jewish matzah brei or the Mexican-American migas, which are made with matzo, and corn tortillas, respectively; whereas fatoot samneh is made with pita bread.

Origins

Fatoot samneh originated as a way for the Yemenite Jewish community to use and repurpose stale pita bread that would have otherwise been discarded. The Yemenite Jewish community was historically very poor, and most of their meals consisted of various soups and stews. Bread such as pita was very valuable, as was "samneh", or clarified butter, and their families were often large and the women of the community traditionally had to make do and cook as many meals as possible from their limited resources to feed their families. Over time fatoot samneh became a popular, and traditional dish among the Yemenite Jews as both a way to use up stale pita bread that was past its prime, as well as a popular breakfast or dinner dish.

Overview

The mixture is combined with beaten/scrambled eggs, and cooked together in a manner similar to matzah brei or migas.

Preparation

Fatoot samneh is typically made in the following manner. Stale flatbread is torn into small pieces and fried in a large amount of hot clarified butter, butter (for milchig/dairy variations), or schmaltz (for fleishig/meat variations, until the pita pieces are toasted and become crispy. Several eggs are heated with kosher salt, and added to the fried pita mixture, which is stirred continuously similar to scrambled eggs, until the eggs are set and have been somewhat absorbed by the pita. Once the fatoot samneh is cooked through it is then topped with honey, silan, or a range of other toppings, condiments, and seasonings.

References

Yemeni cuisine
Mizrahi Jewish cuisine
Sephardi Jewish cuisine
Israeli cuisine
Jewish cuisine
Egg dishes
Bread dishes
Fried foods
Breakfast dishes